Hoop or Hoops may refer to:

Arts and entertainment

Film and television 
 Hoops (TV series), an American animated series

Music 
 Hoops (band), an American indie pop band
 Hoops (album), a 2015 album by The Rubens
 "Hoops" (The Rubens song)
 "Hoops" (Ruby song), 1996
 "Hoops", a song by Saweetie, Salt-N-Pepa and Kash Doll from the Space Jam: A New Legacy soundtrack

Video games 
 Dunk Dream '95, a sequel to the game Street Slam that was known as Hoops in North America
 Hoops (1986 video game), a 1986 college basketball video game
 Hoops (1988 video game), a 1988 basketball video game

Sports 
 Basketball, also referred to as hoops
 Celtic F.C., nicknamed the Hoops
 Hoop (magazine), an American basketball magazine
 Hoop (rhythmic gymnastics), an apparatus in rhythmic gymnastics
 Hoops Club, a Lebanese basketball club
 Queens Park Rangers F.C., nicknamed the Hoops
 Shamrock Rovers F.C., nicknamed the Hoops
 Shamrock Rovers Hoops, an Irish basketball club

Other uses 
 Hoop (surname)
 Hoop (East Indiaman), a Dutch sail ship sunk in 1605
 Hooping, a modern subculture revolving around hoopdance
 HOOPS 3D Graphics System, a 3D Graphics API, part of The HOOPS 3D Application Framework
 A barrel component
 Hoop Earrings
 The rim of a drum

See also
 Hula Hoop (disambiguation)
 De Hoop (disambiguation)
 The Hoops (disambiguation)
 Hooper (disambiguation)
 Hoopers (disambiguation)
 
 Loop (disambiguation)